Montefalcone di Val Fortore is a comune (municipality) in the Province of Benevento in the Italian region Campania, located about 80 km northeast of Naples and about 30 km northeast of Benevento.

Montefalcone di Val Fortore is part of the Roman Catholic Diocese of Ariano Irpino-Lacedonia and its territory borders the following municipalities: Castelfranco in Miscano, Foiano di Val Fortore, Ginestra degli Schiavoni, Roseto Valfortore, San Giorgio La Molara.

References

External links
 Montefalcone Di Val Fortore comune website

Cities and towns in Campania